Huayan Temple or Huayan Monastery is a Buddhist temple located in Datong, Shanxi, China.

Huayan Temple has been burned down and rebuilt several times. The Mahavira Hall and Buddhist Texts Library still preserve the architectural style of the Liao and Jin dynasties (907–1234).
It is an artistic complex of ancient Chinese architecture, sculpture, frescoes and inscriptions, as well as a cultural synthesis of religion and politics.

History

Liao dynasty
The temple was first established in 1038, in the 7th year of Chongxi period (1032–1055) in the Liao dynasty (907–1125). The name of "Huayan" derives from Avatamsaka Sutra, which more commonly known as "Huayan Sutra" in China. Part of the temple was devastated in 1122, during the war between Liao and Jin dynasties.

Jin dynasty
Huayan Temple was restored and redecorated in 1140, in the 3rd year of Tianjuan period (1138–1140) in the Jin dynasty (1115–1234). Abbot Tongwu rebuilt the Mahavira Hall, Guanyin Hall, Shanmen, and Drum tower. In 1166, Emperor Shizong visited the temple.

Yuan dynasty
During the reign of Emperor Wuzong (1308–1311) in the Yuan dynasty (1271–1368), abbot Huiming supervised the reconstruction of Huayan Temple. Mahavira Hall, abbot's room, and dining room were gradually renovated. In the heyday of the temple, it had hundreds of halls and rooms. After the fall of the Yuan dynasty, most of the temple buildings were destroyed in the battle between the Hongjin and Mongolian armies.

Ming dynasty
In the early Ming dynasty (1368–1644), the temple was confiscated. It reactivated its religious activities in the mid-15th century, during the Xuande (1426–1435) and Jingtai periods (1450–1456).

Qing dynasty
At the dawn of the Qing dynasty (1644–1911), in 1648, Huayan Temple was reduced to ashes by a devastating fire, with only the Mahavira Hall and Buddhist Texts Library remaining. The temple declined and  incredibly disappeared during the middle and later Qing dynasty.

People's Republic of China
After the founding of the Communist State, the government provided great protection for the temple.

Huayan Temple as inscribed among the first group of "Major National Historical and Cultural Sites in Shanxi" by the State Council of China in 1961.

It has been designated as a National Key Buddhist Temple in Han Chinese Area by the State Council of China in 1983.

Architecture
The complex includes the following halls: Shanmen, Mahavira Hall, Hall of Maitreya, Hall of Guanyin, Hall of Bhaisajyaguru, Pavilion of Manjushri, Pavilion of Samantabhadra, Bell tower, Drum tower, Hall of Guru, Dharma Hall, Buddhist Texts Library, Wood Pagoda, etc.

Mahavira Hall
The Mahavira Hall was rebuilt in 1140 under the Jin dynasty (1115–1234). On each end of the main ridge is giant Chiwen, a legendary animal with a dragon head and fish tail with colorful glaze and vivid style. They are relics of the Jin (1115–1234) and Ming dynasties (1368–1644).

In the center of the hall enshrines the statues of the Five Tathagathas, which were carved in the Xuande period (1426–1435) of the Ming dynasty (1368–1644). Inner walls were painted with 21 frescos in the Guangxu era (1875–1908) of the Qing dynasty (1644–1911).

Statues of the Twenty-Four Protective Deities are also placed within the hall.

Buddhist Texts Library
The Buddhist Texts Library was established in 1038, under the Liao dynasty (907–1125). It is five rooms wide, four rooms deep with single eave gable and hip roofs. A total of 29 Statues of Buddhist deities are enshrined in the hall, including Sakyamuni, Dīpankara Buddha, Maitreya, Guanyin, Manjushri, Samantabhadra, and Ksitigarbha.

A set of Chinese Buddhist canon which were printed in the Qing dynasty (1644–1911) are preserved in the hall.

Gallery

References

Bibliography

External links

 
Huayan Lower Monastery, Architectura Sinica Site Archive

Buddhist temples in Datong
Tourist attractions in Datong
12th-century establishments in China
12th-century Buddhist temples
Religious buildings and structures completed in 1140